This is a list of foreign ministers in 2019.

Africa
  –
Abdelkader Messahel (2017–2019)
Ramtane Lamamra (2019)
Sabri Boukadoum (2019–2021)
  – Manuel Domingos Augusto (2017–2020)
  – Aurélien Agbénonci (2016–present)
  – Unity Dow (2018–2020)
  – Alpha Barry (2016–2021)
  – Ezéchiel Nibigira (2018–2020)
 -  Lejeune Mbella Mbella (2015–present)
  – Luís Felipe Tavares (2016–2021)
  – Sylvie Baïpo-Temon (2018–present)
  – Mahamat Zene Cherif (2017–2020)
  – Mohamed El-Amine Souef (2017–2020)
  – Jean-Claude Gakosso (2015–present)
  –
Léonard She Okitundu (2016–2019)
Alexis Thambwe Mwamba (acting) (2019)
Franck Mwe di Malila (acting) (2019)
Marie Tumba Nzeza (2019–2021)
  – Mahamoud Ali Youssouf (2005–present)
  – Sameh Shoukry (2014–present)
  – Simeón Oyono Esono Angue (2018–present)
  – Osman Saleh Mohammed (2007–present)
  –
Workneh Gebeyehu (2016–2019)
Gedu Andargachew (2019–2020)
  –
Régis Immongault Tatangani (2018–2019)
Abdu Razzaq Guy Kambogo (2019)
Alain Claude Bilie-By-Nze (2019–2020)
  – Mamadou Tangara (2018–present)
  – Shirley Ayorkor Botchway (2017–present)
  – Mamadi Touré (2017–2021)
  –
João Ribeiro Butiam Có (2018–2019)
Suzi Barbosa (2019–2020)
Aristides Ocante da Silva (2019)
  – Marcel Amon Tanoh (acting to 2017) (2016–2020)
  – Monica Juma (2018–2020)
  – Lesego Makgothi (2017–2020
  – Gbehzohngar Findley (2018–2020)

Government of House of Representatives of Libya (Government of Libya internationally recognized to 2016) –
Mohammed al-Dairi (2014–2019)
Abdulhadi Elhweg (2019–2021)
 Government of National Accord of Libya (Interim government internationally recognized as the sole legitimate government of Libya from 2016) – Mohamed Taha Siala (2016–2021)
  –
Eloi Maxime Alphonse (2018–2019)
Naina Andriantsitohaina (2019–2020)
  –
Emmanuel Fabiano (2017–2019)
Peter Mutharika (2019)
 Francis Kasaila (2019–2020)
  –
Kamissa Camara (2018–2019)
Tiébilé Dramé (2019–2020)
  – Ismail Ould Cheikh Ahmed (2018–present)
  –
Vishnu Lutchmeenaraidoo (2016–2019)
Nando Bodha (2019–2021)
  – Nasser Bourita (2017–present)
  – José Condungua Pacheco (2017–2020)
  – Netumbo Nandi-Ndaitwah (2012–present)
  – Kalla Ankourao (2018–2020)
  – Geoffrey Onyeama (2015–present)
  –
Richard Sezibera (2018–2019)
Vincent Biruta (2019–present)
  – Elsa Teixeira Pinto (2018–2020)
  –
Sidiki Kaba (2017–2019)
Amadou Ba (2019–2020)
  – Vincent Meriton (2018–2020)
  –
Alie Kabba (2018–2019)
Nabeela Tunis (2019–2021)
  – Ahmed Isse Awad (2018–2020)
  – Yasin Haji Mohamoud (2018–present)
  –
Lindiwe Sisulu (2018–2019)
Naledi Pandor (2019–present)
  –
Nhial Deng Nhial (2018–2019)
Awut Deng Acuil (2019–2020)
  –
 al-Dirdiri Mohamed Ahmed (2018–2019)
 Asma Mohamed Abdalla (2019–2020)
  – Thuli Dladla (2018–present)
  –
Augustine Mahiga (2015–2019)
Palamagamba John Aidan Mwaluko Kabudi (2019-2021)
  – Robert Dussey (2013–present)
  –
Khemaies Jhinaoui (2016–2019)
Sabri Bachtabji (acting) (2019–2020)
  – Sam Kutesa (2005–2021)
  – Mohamed Salem Ould Salek (1998–2023)
  – Joe Malanji (2018–2021)
  – Sibusiso Moyo (2017–2021)

Asia
  – Daur Kove (2016–2021)
  –
Salahuddin Rabbani (2015–2019)
Idrees Zaman (acting) (2019–2020)
  – Zohrab Mnatsakanian (2018–2020)
  – Masis Mayilyan (2017–2021)
  – Elmar Mammadyarov (2004–2020)
  – Sheikh Khalid ibn Ahmad Al Khalifah (2005–2020)
  –
Abul Hassan Mahmud Ali (2014–2019)
Abulkalam Abdul Momen (2019–present)
  – Tandi Dorji (2018–present)
  – Hassanal Bolkiah (2015–present)
  – Prak Sokhon (2016–present)
  – Wang Yi (2013–present)
  – Dionísio Babo Soares (2018–2020)
  – Davit Zalkaliani (2018–present)
  –
Sushma Swaraj (2014–2019)
Subrahmanyam Jaishankar (2019–present)
  – Retno Marsudi (2014–present)
  – Mohammad Javad Zarif (2013–2021)
  – Mohamed Ali Alhakim (2018–2020)
  –
Falah Mustafa Bakir (2006–2019)
Safeen Muhsin Dizayee (2019–present)
  –
Benjamin Netanyahu (2015–2019)
Yisrael Katz (2019–2020)
  –
Tarō Kōno (2017–2019)
Toshimitsu Motegi (2019–2021)
  – Ayman Safadi (2017–present)
  –
Beibut Atamkulov (2018–2019)
Mukhtar Tleuberdi (2019–present)
  – Ri Yong-ho (2016–2020)
  – Kang Kyung-wha (2017–2021)
  –
Sheikh Sabah Al-Khalid Al-Sabah (2011–2019)
Sheikh Ahmad Nasser Al Muhammad Al Sabah (2019–present)
  – Chingiz Aidarbekov (2018–2020)
  – Saleumxay Kommasith (2016–present)
  – Gebran Bassil (2014–2020)
  – Saifuddin Abdullah (2018–2020)
  – Abdulla Shahid (2018–present)
  – Damdin Tsogtbaatar (2017–2020)
  – Aung San Suu Kyi (2016–2021)
  – Pradeep Gyawali (2018–2021)
  – Yusuf bin Alawi bin Abdullah (1982–2020)
  – Shah Mehmood Qureshi (2018–present)
  – Riyad al-Maliki (2007–present)
  – Teodoro Locsin Jr. (2018–2022)
  – Sheikh Mohammed bin Abdulrahman Al Thani (2016–present)

  –
Ibrahim Abdulaziz Al-Assaf (2018–2019)
Prince Faisal bin Farhan Al Saud (2019–present)
  – Vivian Balakrishnan (2015–present)
  – Dmitry Medoyev (2017–present)
  –
Tilak Marapana (2018–2019)
Dinesh Gunawardena (2019–2021)
  – Walid Muallem (2006–2020)
  – Joseph Wu (2018–present)
  – Sirodjidin Aslov (2013–present)
  – Don Pramudwinai (2015–present)
  – Mevlüt Çavuşoğlu (2015–present)
  – Raşit Meredow (2001–present)
  – Sheikh Abdullah bin Zayed Al Nahyan (2006–present)
  – Abdulaziz Komilov (2012–present)
  – Phạm Bình Minh (2011–2021)

Republic of Yemen –
Khaled al-Yamani (2018–2019)
Mohammed A. Al-Hadhramii (2019–2020)
Supreme Political Council (unrecognised, rival government) – Hisham Abdullah (2016–present)

Europe
  –
Ditmir Bushati (2013–2019)
Edi Rama (2019–2020)
  – Maria Ubach i Font (2017–present)
  –
Karin Kneissl (2017–2019)
Alexander Schallenberg (2019–2021)
  – Vladimir Makei (2012–present)
  –
Didier Reynders (2011–2019)
Philippe Goffin (2019–2020)
  -
Guy Vanhengel (2013–2019)
Pascal Smet (2019–present)
  -
Geert Bourgeois (2014–2019)
Ben Weyts (2019)
Jan Jambon (2019–present)
  Wallonia -
Willy Borsus (2017–2019)
Elio Di Rupo (2019–present)
  –
Igor Crnadak (2015–2019)
Bisera Turković (2019–present)
  – Ekaterina Zakharieva (2017–2021)
  –
Marija Pejčinović Burić (2017–2019)
Gordan Grlić-Radman (2019–present)
  – Nikos Christodoulides (2018–2022)
  – Tomáš Petříček (2018–2021)
  –
Anders Samuelsen (2016–2019)
Jeppe Kofod (2019–present)
  –
Poul Michelsen (2015–2019)
Jenis av Rana (2019–present)
  Donetsk People's Republic – Natalya Nikonorova (2016–present)
  –
Sven Mikser (2016–2019)
Urmas Reinsalu (2019–2021)
  –
Timo Soini (2015–2019)
Pekka Haavisto (2019–present)
  – Jean-Yves Le Drian (2017–present)
  – Heiko Maas (2018–2021)
  –
Alexis Tsipras (2018–2019)
Georgios Katrougalos (2019)
Nikos Dendias (2019–present)
  – Jonathan Le Tocq (2016–present)
  – Péter Szijjártó (2014–present)
  – Guðlaugur Þór Þórðarson (2017–2021)
  – Simon Coveney (2017–present)
  –
Enzo Moavero Milanesi (2018–2019)
Luigi Di Maio (2019–present)
  – Ian Gorst (2018–present)
  – Behgjet Pacolli (2017–2020)
  – Edgars Rinkēvičs (2011–present)
  –
Aurelia Frick (2009–2019)
Mauro Pedrazzini (acting) (2019)
Katrin Eggenberger (2019–present)
  – Linas Antanas Linkevičius (2012–2020)
  Lugansk People's Republic – Vladislav Deinevo (2017–present)
  – Jean Asselborn (2004–present)
  – Nikola Dimitrov (2017–2020)
  – Carmelo Abela (2017–2020)
  –
Tudor Ulianovschi (2018–2019)
Nicu Popescu (2019)
Aureliu Ciocoi (2019–2020)
  Gagauzia – Vitaliy Vlah (2015–present)
  – 
Gilles Tonelli (2015–2019)
Laurent Anselmi (2019–2022)
  – Srđan Darmanović (2016–2020)
  – Stef Blok (2018–2021)
  – Kudret Özersay (2018–2020)
  – Ine Marie Eriksen Søreide (2017–2021)
  – Jacek Czaputowicz (2018–2020)
  – Augusto Santos Silva (2015–present)
  – 
Teodor Meleșcanu (2017–2019)
Ramona Mănescu (2019)
Bogdan Aurescu (2019–present)
  – Sergey Lavrov (2004–present)
  – Nicola Renzi (2016–present)
  – Ivica Dačić (2014–2020)
  – Miroslav Lajčák (2012–2020)
  – Miro Cerar (2018–2020)
  –
Josep Borrell (2018–2019)
Margarita Robles (interim) (2019–2020)
  – Alfred Bosch (2018–2020)
  –
Margot Wallström (2014–2019)
Ann Linde (2019–present)
  – Ignazio Cassis (2017–present)
  – Vitaly Ignatyev (2015–present)

  –
Pavlo Klimkin (2014–2019)
Vadym Prystaiko (2019–2020)
  -
Jeremy Hunt (2018–2019)
Dominic Raab (2019–2021)
  – Fiona Hyslop (2009–2020)
  – Archbishop Paul Gallagher (2014–present)

North America and the Caribbean
  – E.P. Chet Greene (2018–present)
  – Darren Henfield (2017–2021)
  – Jerome Walcott (2018–present)
  – Wilfred Elrington (2008–2020)
  –
Chrystia Freeland (2017–2019)
François-Philippe Champagne (2019–2021)
  Quebec – Nadine Girault (2018–present)
  –
Lorena Aguilar Revelo (acting) (2018–2019)
Manuel Ventura (2019–2020)
  – Bruno Rodríguez Parrilla (2009–present)
  –
Francine Baron (2014–2019)
Kenneth Darroux (2019–present)
  – Miguel Vargas Maldonado (2016–2020)
  –
Carlos Alfredo Castaneda (2018–2019)
Alexandra Hill Tinoco (2019–present)
  Greenland – Ane Lone Bagger (2018–2020)
  – Peter David (2018–2020)
 – Sandra Jovel (2017–2020)
  – Bocchit Edmond (2018–2020)
  – 
María Dolores Agüero (2016–2019)
Lisandro Rosales (2019–2022)
  – Kamina Johnson-Smith (2016–present)
  – Marcelo Ebrard (2018–present)
  –Denis Moncada (2017–present)
  –
Isabel Saint Malo (2014–2019)
Alejandro Ferrer López (2019–2020)
  –
Luis G. Rivera Marín (2017–2019)
Pedro Pierluisi (acting) (2019)
Elmer Román (2019–2020)
  – Mark Brantley (2015–present)
  – Allen Chastanet (2016–2021)
  – Sir Louis Straker (2015–2020)
  – Dennis Moses (2015–2020)
  – Mike Pompeo (2018–2021)

Oceania
  – Marise Payne (2018–present)
  – Henry Puna (2013–2020)
  –
Frank Bainimarama (2016–2019)
Inia Seruiratu (2019–2020)
   – Édouard Fritch (2014–present)
  – Taneti Mamau (2016–present)
  – John Silk (2016–2020)
  –
Lorin S. Robert (2007–2019)
Kandhi Elieisar (2019–present)
  –
Baron Waqa (2013–2019)
Lionel Aingimea (2019–present)
  – Winston Peters (2017–2020)
  – Toke Talagi (2008–2020)
  – Faustina Rehuher-Marugg (2017–2021)
  –
Rimbink Pato (2012–2019)
Solan Mirisim (2019)
Soroi Eoe (2019)
Patrick Pruaitch (2019–2020)
  – Tuilaep Aiono Sailele Malielegaoi (1998–2021)
  –
Milner Tozaka (2014–2019)
Jeremiah Manele (2019–present)
  –
Afega Gaualofa (2018–2019)
Kerisiano Kalolo (2019–2020)
  –
 ʻAkilisi Pōhiva (2018–2019)
 Semisi Sika (acting) (2019)
 Pohiva Tu'i'onetoa (2019–2021)
  –
Taukelina Finikaso (2013–2019)
Simon Kofe (2019–present)
  – Ralph Regenvanu (2017–2020)

South America
  –
Jorge Faurie (2017–2019)
Felipe Solá (2019–present)
  –
Diego Pary (2018–2019)
Karen Longaric (2019–2020)
  – 
Aloysio Nunes (2017–2019)
Ernesto Araújo (2019–2021)
  –
Roberto Ampuero (2018–2019)
Teodoro Ribera (2019–2020)
  –
Carlos Holmes Trujillo (2018–2019)
Adriana Mejía (acting) (2019)
Claudia Blum (2019–2021)
  – José Valencia Amores (2018–2020)
  –
Carl Greenidge (2015–2019)
Karen Cummings (2019–2020)
  –
Luis Castiglioni (2018–2019)
Antonio Rivas Palacios (2019–2020)
  –
Néstor Popolizio (2018–2019)
Gustavo Meza-Cuadra (2019–2020)
  – Yldiz Pollack-Beighle (2017–2020)
  – Rodolfo Nin Novoa (2015–2020)
  – Jorge Arreaza (2017–2021)

See also

List of current foreign ministers

References

Foreign ministers
2019 in international relations
Foreign ministers
2019